The Office of Population Research (OPR) at Princeton University is the oldest population research center in the United States. Founded in 1936, the OPR is a leading demographic research and training center. Recent research activity has primarily focused on healthcare, social demography, urbanization, and migration. The OPR's research has been cited in numerous articles by the New York Times and the Wall Street Journal.

History
Major General, heir, and eugenicist Frederick H. Osborn, a graduate of Princeton University, laid the foundation for the Office of Population Research in 1936. The founding director of OPR was Frank W. Notestein, who was a demographer at the Milbank Memorial Fund, a leading peer-reviewed healthcare journal. While at the OPR, he was also the director of the Population Division of the United Nations between 1946 and 1948. He left in 1959 to lead the Population Council, an international, nonprofit, non-governmental organization. He was succeeded as OPR director by Ansley J. Coale, who held the post from 1959 to 1975. One of the early faculty appointments was Irene Barnes Taeuber, whose scholarly work helped found the science of demography.

The current Director of the OPR is Douglas Massey, an American sociologist and Professor at the Woodrow Wilson School of Public and International Affairs.

Academics
The OPR offers four degrees and certifications for graduate students at Princeton:
 Ph.D. in Demography 
 Department Degree with Specialization in Population 
 Joint-Degree Program in Demography and Social Policy 
 Certificate in Demography

Ph.D. in Demography
The Ph.D. in Demography enrolls a small number of graduate students with an interest in population research and strong quantitative backgrounds, such as statistics and mathematics. The program allows students to select up to two fields of concentration.

Department Degree with Specialization in Population
Doctoral candidates in other departments at Princeton are able to work towards a specialization in Population. Most of these students work primarily in the Departments of Economics or Sociology, while some may also come from the Departments of History or Politics.

Joint-Degree Program
The Joint-Degree Program allows students interested specifically in Social Policy to apply for a specialized program. Students apply after their first or second year of graduate study and must complete additional coursework in “Issues in Inequality and Social Policy,” and “Advanced Empirical Workshop.” In the 2018–2019 academic year, there were nine students concentrating in Social Policy.

Certificate in Demography
The Office of Population Research, in connection with the Program in Population Studies, offers a non-degree Certificate in Demography for students who complete four approved courses, one Independent Reading course, and one elective. Students must complete an individual or joint-research project under the supervision of an OPR faculty or research. Students who complete this certificate are often enrolled in the Master's of Public Administration program at the Woodrow Wilson School.

Research

Specialties
Research conducted at the OPR falls within six categories:
 Biosocial Interactions
 Children, Youth, and Families
 Data and Methods
 Education and Stratification
 Health and Wellbeing
 Migration and Development

Affiliations
The OPR maintains close relations with other departments within the Woodrow Wilson School of Public and International Affairs. Because of its inherent interdisciplinary research, the OPR works with researchers at the Bendheim-Thoman Center for Research on Child Wellbeing (CRCW), the  Center for Migration and Development (CMD), and the Center for Health and Wellbeing (CHW). Outside of Princeton, the OPR maintains partnerships with some of the world's leading research centers, including the Wiggenstein Centre for Demography and Global Human Capital and the United Nations Economic Commission for Europe.

References

External links
 
 Intute entry
 OPR history

Princeton University
Population
Research institutes established in 1936
Research institutes in New Jersey
Demographics of the United States
1936 establishments in New Jersey